The 2017 BRDC British Formula 3 Championship is a motor racing championship for open wheel, formula racing cars held across England and Belgium. The season began at Oulton Park on 15 April and ended on 25 September at Donington Park, after eight triple header events for a total of twenty-four races.

Teams and drivers
All teams were British-registered.

Race calendar and results 

The calendar was published on 21 September 2016. The series will support British GT at all events. It will have one oversea round at Spa-Francorchamps in Belgium.

Championship standings
Scoring system
Points were awarded to the top 20 classified finishers in all races.

Drivers' championship

References

External links
 

BRDC British Formula 3 Championship seasons
Brdc Formula 3
Brdc Formula 3
BRDC Formula 3